Scrafford is a surname. Notable people with the surname include: 

Justus Scrafford (1878–1947), American track and field athlete
Kirk Scrafford (born 1967), American football player